The Perodua Kenari is a city car produced by Malaysian automotive company Perodua. The Kenari is based on the second generation Daihatsu Move kei car (minicar) with a 990 cc DOHC engine powering it. The name Kenari is a Malaysian name equivalent to the word canary, which translates to joy and freedom.

History 
The Perodua Kenari was launched in 2000 with three variants: EX (Standard) (5-speed manual), GX (Deluxe) (5-speed manual) and EZ (4-speed automatic).

In April 2003, Perodua introduced the facelift model. Changes included new headlights, a new front grille and a 14" alloy wheel design that became standard throughout the 4-model range: GX, EZ, EZ Special (EZS) and GX Aero. The GX Aero was offered only with a manual transmission and was only available in Mistik Red. It had a body kit consisting of side skirts, a different spoiler and different styling for the rear lighting units. The interior of the GX Aero featured "cubic" printing on the centre dashboard console surfaces. 

In September 2003, the company showed a hybrid version of the Perodua Kenari that didn't make it to production. The prototype used a 659 cc petrol engine which produced 30 kW/41 bhp of power and 57 Nm of torque, coupled to an electric motor that generated 18 kW/25 bhp of power and 100 Nm of torque.

In November 2006, the company introduced the Perodua Kenari RS.

Perodua ended production and sales of the Kenari in 2009 with no direct replacement model.

Variants

Malaysia

Gallery

Export 
Perodua exported the Kenari to the United Kingdom in two variants: GX and EZ.

Powertrain

References

External links
Perodua Fan Site
Kenari specifications

Kenari
Cars introduced in 2000